Ahn Do-gyu (born September 28, 2000) is a South Korean actor.

Filmography

Television series

Web series

Films

Theater

Awards and nominations

References

External links
 
 
 

2000 births
Living people
South Korean male film actors
South Korean male television actors
South Korean male child actors
South Korean male web series actors
21st-century South Korean male actors